USS Holder has been the name of two ships of the United States Navy.  Both ships are named for Lieutenant (jg) Randolph Mitchell Holder, a Navy pilot who died during the Battle of Midway.

United States Navy ship names